Gunavantha is a 2007 Kannada romance film directed by Raghuvardhan and starring Prem Kumar and Rekha Vedavyas in the lead roles with Sharan and Rangayana Raghu in other pivotal roles. The film had musical score and lyrics written by Hamsalekha.

The film opened on 30 November 2007 to mixed reviews and didn't perform well at the box-office.

Cast
 Prem Kumar as Guna shekar
 Rekha Vedavyas as Uma
 Rangayana Raghu as Gold Reddy
 Sharan
 Avinash
 Chitra Shenoy as Padma
 Padmaja Rao
 Ramesh Bhat

Soundtrack
The film's score and soundtrack was composed by Nadha brahma Hamsalekha.

References

External links
Gunavantha reviews

Indian romance films
2007 films
2000s Kannada-language films
Films scored by Hamsalekha
2000s romance films